The 125th Infantry Regiment, Michigan Army National Guard, is a regiment under the U.S. Army Regimental System, with headquarters now in Saginaw, Michigan. The regiment currently consists of the 1st Battalion, 125th Infantry, an infantry battalion in the 37th Infantry Brigade Combat Team.

Organization
The 1st Battalion, 125th Infantry Regiment currently oversees A Headquarters and Headquarters Company and 5 companies within the Michigan Army National Guard.
Headquarters and Headquarters Company (HHC) - Saginaw, MI
Company A - Detroit, MI
Company B - Saginaw, MI
Company C - Wyoming, MI
Company D - Big Rapids, MI
Company H (FSC), 237th Brigade Support Battalion - Bay City, MI

History

Early history and formation

The 125th traces its lineage back to the 1850s when on 24 December 1857 and 4 January 1858, two respective militia companies were formed; the East Saginaw Guards and the Flint Union Grays.  On 25 April 1861 the two companies combined and expanded to form the 2nd Michigan Volunteer Infantry Regiment.  The regiment was mustered into federal service a month later on 25 May 1861 and fought for the duration of the Civil War.  The regiment mustered out of Federal service on 29 June 1865. Companies from the Saginaw and Flint areas withdrew from the regiment in 1876 and consolidated with elements of the 1st Michigan Volunteer Infantry Regiment to form the 3rd Infantry Regiment.  In April 1915, the 3rd Infantry Regiment was designated as the 33rd Infantry. The regiment was mustered into federal service in June 1916 and was drafted in August 1917. The 33rd combined with the 1st Battalion, 31st Infantry to form the new 125th Infantry Regiment. The regiment was summarily assigned to the 32nd Infantry Division.

The 125th Infantry was inducted into Federal service on 15 October 1940. Due to the 32nd Infantry Division being converted into the army's triangular division of three regiments as opposed to the previous "square" division of four regiments, the 125th was relieved from assignment to the 32d Division on 8 December 1941. 

The 125th Infantry Regiment was sent to California in preparation for a possible invasion by the Japanese. The invasion never happened; the 125th Infantry became cadre for new U.S. Army units being activated. On May 1, 1942 the newly organized Northern California Sector and VII Army Corps included the 125th Infantry. 

The regiment was inactivated 20 September 1945 at Camp Rucker, Alabama.

The regiment was then assigned on 31 May 1946 to the 46th Infantry Division.

Recent history

1-125th Infantry

Task Force 1-125 Infantry began flowing into Afghanistan in December 2011. Inclement weather delayed many of the battalion soldiers entry into theater until late January. Relief-in-place was conducted with the 2nd Battalion, 18th Infantry Regiment, 170th Infantry Brigade Combat Team for Forward Operating Base Kunduz, Kunduz City, Kunduz Province, Afghanistan. Other battalion locations were in Imam Sahib City, Imam Sahib District, Kunduz Province; Shir Khan Bandar, Imam Sahib District; and Doshi District, Baghlan Province.
Each company deployed with a security force assistance team, consisting of a senior advisor and senior noncommissioned officer, along with several subject matter expert enablers. The companies conducted security force missions to secure the advising teams during key leader engagements and other meetings with their Afghan National Security Force counterparts. The SFATs partnered, assisted and advised their counterparts initially on operations, rule of law, logistics, training/administration, government/development and maintenance/signal. The main effort switched to logistics, with the intent of enabling the ANSF to be self-sustaining to increase their operational capabilities. This effort met with mixed results and led to another change in priority to operations and rule of law being the main effort with logistics and human resource operations as supporting efforts.
During the spring, elements of the battalion closed one combat outpost, with SFAT operations in that area ceasing shortly after.

HHC
HHC was responsible for base defense operations and Mayor Cell duties of Forward Operating Base Kunduz. They improved operations and upgraded security by implementing new procedures during searches for entering the FOB. They had more than 7,000 entries in the Biometrics Automated Toolset System and vehicles searched and processed through the entry control point. They also developed and coordinated more than 50 base improvement projects to improve the quality of life for all FOB tenants.

A Company
A Company was responsible for three distinct security force advisory missions: 3rd platoon provided security forces for the Khanabad District advising mission, which was successfully handed over to Afghan leadership; 2nd platoon provided SECFOR and helped strengthen the security and force protection measures for the Afghan Operations Coordination Center (Provincial), and the Provincial Headquarters in Kunduz; 1st platoon aided in teaching rule of law classes and provided SECFOR for the Gor Teppa area outside Kunduz City. Gor Teppa was the focal point and testing ground for the new evidence-based operations mission set that focused efforts on community-based policing and ANSF investigating and pursuing prosecution of crimes committed in the area.

B Company
B Company was responsible for the border crossing mission at Combat Outpost Shir Khan, along with supporting an SFAT.

C Company
C Company worked with an SFAT and the Afghan Uniform Police and National Directorate of Security in the Imam Sahib and Dasht-e Archi Districts. In late February, COP Fortitude was the scene of a peaceful demonstration that turned violent. Multiple soldiers were injured during this event. Company leadership demonstrated tactical restraint when they chose to use only non-lethal munitions and tactics to disperse the crowd of mostly peaceful demonstrators, with suspected insurgent agitators mixed in. In late May, the COP was dismantled and the area turned back over to the ANSF.

D Company
D Company conducted security force assistance for more than 300 Afghan Uniform Police in Baghlan province at the PHQ and Doshi district headquarters. As part of that mission, they conducted multiple combined dismounted patrols with the Doshi AUP. They also conducted multiple missions to the Salang Pass to ensure ISAF and civilian freedom of movement. During these missions, they aided in a security and recovery operation, as well as an assistance and humanitarian aid mission after an avalanche.

H Company, 237th BSB
H Company provided logistics and sustainment operations for the entire battalion. They brought the operational readiness rate of the battalion from 80 to 98 percent for more than 150 tactical vehicles. They also turned in more than $200 million of excess equipment and repair parts. The Distribution Platoon traveled more than 50,000 miles to ensure all locations had the necessary supplies and equipment to run their daily operations.

Coat of arms

Shield

The shield is blue and white to difference it from the former coat of arms of the 125th Infantry Regiment, parent organization, now redesignated for the 425th Infantry Regiment, Michigan National Guard.  The palm tree, eleven mullets (stars), and the crowned lion–all charges taken from this coat of arms–are applicable to the organization's historical background.  The palm tree represents service at Santiago during the Spanish–American War, and the eleven mullets are for Civil War service.  The crowned lion taken from the Arms of Hesse symbolize the organization's entrance into Germany during World War I.

Crest
The crest is that of the Michigan Army National Guard.

Lineage and honors

Campaign streamers
Civil War
Bull Run
Peninsula
Manassas
Fredericksburg
Vicksburg
Wilderness
Spotsylvania
Cold Harbor
Petersburg
Appomattox
Mississippi (1863)
Tennessee (1863)

War with Spain
Santiago

World War I
Aisne-Marne
Oise-Aisne
Meuse-Argonne
Alsace 1918

War on Terrorism

Iraq:
Iraqi Surge
Afghanistan:
Transition I

Company A (Detroit), 1st Battalion, additionally entitled to
World War II

Northern France
Rhineland
Ardennes-Alsace
Central Europe

Korean War

First UN Counteroffensive
CCF Spring Offensive
UN Summer-Fall Offensive
Second Korean Winter
Korea, Summer-Fall 1952
Third Korean Winter
Korea, Summer 1953

War on Terrorism

Global War on Terrorism
Iraqi Sovereignty

Company B (Saginaw), 1st Battalion, additionally entitled to

War on Terrorism

Iraqi Governance
National Resolution (Iraq)

Company D (Big Rapids), 1st Battalion, additionally entitled to

World War II

Papua
New Guinea (with arrowhead)
Leyte
Luzon

Unit decorations
 Meritorious Unit Commendation (Army), Streamer embroidered AFGHANISTAN JAN-SEP 2012
 French Croix de Guerre with Palm, World War I, Streamer embroidered OISE-AISNE

Company A (Detroit), 1st Battalion, additionally entitled to
Meritorious Unit Commendation (Army), Streamer embroidered EUROPEAN THEATER
Meritorious Unit Commendation (Army), Streamer embroidered KOREA
French Croix de Guerre with Palm, Streamer embroidered OISE-AISNE

Company B (Saginaw), 1st Battalion, additionally entitled to
Navy Unit Commendation, Streamer embroidered ANBAR PROVINCE FEB –JUN 2006
Meritorious Unit Commendation (Army), Streamer embroidered IRAQ 2004

Company D (Big Rapids), 1st Battalion, additionally entitled to
Presidential Unit Citation (Army), Streamer embroidered PAPUA
Meritorious Unit Commendation (Army), Streamer embroidered IRAQ SEP 2006 – AUG 2007
Philippine Presidential Unit Citation, Streamer embroidered 17 OCTOBER 1944 TO 4 JULY 1945

References

Infantry
Infantry regiments of the United States Army National Guard
Military units and formations in Michigan
Infantry Regiment
125
Military units and formations established in 1857